Theenmura also spelled theen mura is the traditional banquet of Saint Thomas Christians of Kerala, India. It is a non-vegetarian form of festive main meal and significantly differs from the vegetarian banquet sadhya in dishes and course of serving. It is typically served in Christian festivals such as Christmas, Easter, Nalpiravi, Pindikuthi Perunnal, Dukrana and family celebrations of Christians such as marriage, baptism, first Communion and engagement.

A typical theenmura may include, but is not limited to, cake with wine, toddy, meat cutlet with challas (a kind of salad), appam, parotta, mutton stew, fish mollee, boiled rice, Malabar matthi curry, and beef vindaloo.

See also

 Saint Thomas Christians
 Cuisine of Kerala
 South Indian cuisine

References

Kerala cuisine
Eating parties